English singer Charli XCX has released five studio albums, four mixtapes, three extended plays, one live album, two DJ mixes, 46 singles (including 15 as a featured artist), and 13 promotional singles. In 2007, XCX began recording her debut album on a loan granted by her parents. Titled 14, after her age at the time, it received only a restricted public release. Two singles, "!Franchesckaar!" and double A-side "Emelline"/"Art Bitch", were released in late 2008 under Orgy Music. In June 2012, Charli XCX released her first mixtape, titled Heartbreaks and Earthquakes, a one-track file consisting of eight songs. A second mixtape, titled Super Ultra, was released in November of the same year. Charli XCX's major-label debut studio album, True Romance, was released in April 2013, and peaked at number 85 on the UK Albums Chart. While failing to appear on any main album charts internationally, the album reached number five on the Heatseekers Albums chart in the United States and number 11 on the ARIA Hitseekers chart in Australia. The album spawned five singles—"Stay Away", "Nuclear Seasons", "You're the One", "You (Ha Ha Ha)" and "What I Like". In 2012, Charli XCX was featured on Icona Pop's song "I Love It", which peaked at number one in the UK and reached the top 10 in various countries including the US, Canada, Ireland and Germany. 

"SuperLove" was released as a stand-alone single in December 2013, peaking at number 62 on the UK Singles Chart. In 2014, Charli XCX released the single "Boom Clap" for the soundtrack to the film The Fault in Our Stars. The song was an international success, peaking at number six on the UK Singles Chart, number eight on the US Billboard Hot 100 and reaching the top 10 in Australia, Canada and New Zealand. "Boom Clap" was later included on Charli XCX's second studio album, Sucker, released in December 2014. The album charted at number 15 in her native UK, number 28 in the United States, and entered the top 50 in several other countries including Austria, Belgium, France, Ireland, and Switzerland. Sucker also spawned the top-40 UK single "Break the Rules" and the top-10 UK single "Doing It", which features English singer Rita Ora. Also in 2014, Charli XCX was featured on Iggy Azalea's "Fancy", which topped the US Billboard Hot 100 and charted in the top 10 in several countries including the UK, Canada, Ireland and Australia.

In 2016 Charli XCX released the Vroom Vroom EP, which while not a commercial success, signaled a move for the singer into more experimental electronic territory. In promotion of her third studio album, she released the top-40 hits "After the Afterparty" and "Boys". After the album leaked however, the project was scrapped. In 2017 Charli XCX released two more experimental mixtapes, Number 1 Angel, and Pop 2, which both received critical acclaim.

In September 2019 she released her third studio album Charli, which debuted at number 14 in the United Kingdom, number 42 in the United States, and entered the top 50 in Australia, Canada, Ireland, New Zealand, and Spain. The album's lead single "1999" peaked at number 13 in the UK. She followed-up Charli with How I'm Feeling Now (2020), an album recorded in six weeks during COVID-19 lockdowns. The album debuted at number 33 in the UK and received critical acclaim.

Charli XCX released her fifth studio album Crash in March 2022, her last album under contract with Atlantic Records. Crash is her most commercially successful album to date, topping the charts in the UK, Australia, and Ireland, and becoming her first top 20 in the United States, Belgium and Germany. It also spawned the top-40 single "Beg for You".

Albums

Studio albums

Live albums

DJ mix albums

Mixtapes

Extended plays

Singles

As lead artist

As featured artist

Promotional singles

Other charted songs

Guest appearances

Songwriting credits

Music videos

As lead artist

Notes

References

External links
 
 
 
 

Discography
Discographies of British artists
Pop music discographies